Brook Hill Farm is a historic home and farm located near Forest, Bedford County, Virginia, USA. It was built in 1904, and is a 1½-story, frame Queen Anne style dwelling. It incorporates the broad, compact form of the Bungalow / Craftsman style. It has a wraparound porch with Doric order columns. Also on the property are a contributing original icehouse, hog barn, blacksmith's shop and a schoolhouse built in 1909. Historic sites include an old barn site and carriage house site.

It was listed on the National Register of Historic Places in 1997. It is located in the Bellevue Rural Historic District.

References

Houses on the National Register of Historic Places in Virginia
Farms on the National Register of Historic Places in Virginia
Queen Anne architecture in Virginia
Houses completed in 1904
Houses in Bedford County, Virginia
National Register of Historic Places in Bedford County, Virginia
Individually listed contributing properties to historic districts on the National Register in Virginia
1904 establishments in Virginia
Blacksmith shops